Tomoxia laticollis is a species of beetle in the genus Tomoxia of the family Mordellidae. It was described by Píc in 1936.

References

Beetles described in 1936
Tomoxia